Ellis is a surname. 

Ellis may also refer to:

Places

United States
 Ellis, Indiana
 Ellis, Steuben County, Indiana
 Ellis, Kansas
 Ellis, Minnesota
 Ellis, Missouri
 Ellis, Nebraska
 Ellis, Ohio
 Ellis, South Dakota
 Ellis, Wisconsin
 Ellis County, Kansas
 Ellis County, Oklahoma
 Ellis County, Texas
 Ellis Island, New York
 Ellis Township, Michigan
 Ellis River (Maine)
 Ellis River (New Hampshire)
 Camp Ellis, Fulton County, Illinois, a World War II Army Service Forces Unit Training Center and prisoner-of-war camp

Elsewhere
 Ellis Island (Queensland), Australia
 Ellis River (New Zealand)

People
 Ellis (given name)

Arts and entertainment
 Ellis (film), a short film
 Ellis, a band fronted by Steve Ellis
 Ellis Carver, a fictional character on the television series The Wire
 Ellis, a character in the Battle Arena Toshinden video game series
 Ellis, a playable character in Left 4 Dead 2

Other uses
 European Laboratory for Learning and Intelligent Systems (ELLIS)
 USS Ellis (DD-154), a United States Navy destroyer that served in World War II
 The Ellis, a mid-rise residential building in Uptown Charlotte, North Carolina, United States
 Ellis Hotel, Atlanta, Georgia, United States, on the National Register of Historic Places
 The Ellis School, Pittsburgh, Pennsylvania, United States, an independent, all-girls, college-preparatory school
 Ellis Unit, a prison in Walker County, Texas

See also
 Elis (disambiguation)
 Elys (disambiguation)
 Ellice (disambiguation)
 Ellis Spring, a stream in Georgia